Golyamo Kamenyane is a village in Krumovgrad Municipality, Kardzhali Province, southern Bulgaria.

The village is located 10 km southeast of Krumovgrad, 58 km in the same direction of the regional center Kardzhali and about 299 km southeast of the capital Sofia city. The village is only 14 km away from the national border with Greece. Golyamo Kamenyane is located in a mountainous area at an altitude of about 400 m. It is part of the Mediterranean climate zone which determines the mild winter and the hot summer.
 
The population is about 371 people. Golyamo Kamenyane has relatively good infrastructure. The roads are in good condition, it has water and electricity supply and regular bus transport that connects it with the municipality center Krumovgrad.

References

Villages in Kardzhali Province